James Edward Drummond Young, Lord Drummond Young,  (born 17 February 1950) is a retired judge of the Supreme Courts of Scotland and was formerly Chairman of the Scottish Law Commission.

Early life
James Drummond Young was born in Edinburgh the son of Duncan Drummond Young (1914-2007) and his wife, Annette Mackay (1914-1995).

He was educated at John Watson's School in the city. He studied law at Sidney Sussex College, Cambridge (BA 1971), Harvard University (Joseph Hodges Choate Memorial Fellow, 1971–72; LLM 1972) and the University of Edinburgh School of Law (LLB 1974), and was admitted to the Faculty of Advocates in 1976, taking silk in 1988.

He served as Standing Junior Counsel to the Department of Industry from 1984 to 1986 and to the Inland Revenue from 1986 to 1988, and as an Advocate Depute from 1999 to 2001. He is co-author with John St. Clair of The Law of Corporate Insolvency in Scotland, first published in 1988 and revised in 1992 and 2004.

Judicial career
Drummond Young was appointed a Senator of the College of Justice, a judge of the Court of Session and High Court of Justiciary, Scotland's supreme courts, in July 2001, taking the judicial title, Lord Drummond Young. He formerly sat in the Outer House, and was appointed to the Inner House in June 2013. On 1 January 2007, Lord Drummond Young succeeded Lord Eassie for a five-year term as Chairman of the Scottish Law Commission, an advisory board to the Scottish Government which reviews, and recommends reform of, the Law of Scotland.  Lord Drummond Young demitted office in December 2011, but continued as Acting Chairman until Lady Clark of Calton was appointed Chairman in June 2012. He retired in March 2020.

Personal life
Lord Drummond Young married Elizabeth Mary Campbell-Kease in 1991, with whom he has a daughter. His interests include music and travel, and he is a member of The Speculative Society of Edinburgh.

References

1950 births
Living people
Lawyers from Edinburgh
Senators of the College of Justice
Alumni of Sidney Sussex College, Cambridge
Alumni of the University of Edinburgh
Harvard Law School alumni
People educated at John Watson's Institution
Members of the Faculty of Advocates
Scottish King's Counsel
20th-century King's Counsel
Members of the Privy Council of the United Kingdom
Contestants on University Challenge